Catalina Walther (born 10 May 1983) is an Argentine windsurfer. She competed in the women's Mistral One Design event at the 2004 Summer Olympics.

References

External links
 
 

1983 births
Living people
Argentine female sailors (sport)
Argentine windsurfers
Olympic sailors of Argentina
Sailors at the 2004 Summer Olympics – Mistral One Design
Place of birth missing (living people)
Female windsurfers